Sainte-Brigitte-des-Saults is a parish municipality in the Centre-du-Québec region of southwestern Quebec. The population as of the Canada 2011 Census was 737.

Demographics 

Population trend:

Mother tongue language (2006)

See also
List of parish municipalities in Quebec

References

Parish municipalities in Quebec
Incorporated places in Centre-du-Québec